The 2021 Allsvenskan was the 97th season since its establishment in 1924 of Sweden's top-level football league, Allsvenskan. A total of 16 teams participated. Malmö FF were the defending champions after winning the title in the previous season, and they defended the championship in the 30th and final round on 4 December 2021 and secured their 22nd Swedish championship title by playing a scoreless tie at home against Halmstads BK, resulting in Malmö FF winning the title on better goal difference than the runner-up (AIK). This was the first time the title was defended since 2017, and the third consecutive defense of the title that went to Malmö FF, having also defended the title in 2014.

The 2021 Allsvenskan season began on 10 April and ended on 4 December 2021 (not including play-off matches).

Teams

A total of sixteen teams are contesting the league, including fourteen sides from the previous season, and two promoted teams from the 2020 Superettan.

Falkenbergs FF and Helsingborgs IF (both relegated after two years in the top flight) were relegated at the end of the 2020 season after finishing at the bottom two places of the table, and were replaced by the 2020 Superettan champions Halmstads BK (promoted after a three-year absence) and runners-up Degerfors IF (promoted after a twenty-three-year absence).

Stadiums and locations

Personnel and kits
All teams are obligated to have the logo of the league sponsor Unibet as well as the Allsvenskan logo on the right sleeve of their shirt.

Note: Flags indicate national team as has been defined under FIFA eligibility rules. Players and Managers may hold more than one non-FIFA nationality.

Managerial changes

League table

Positions by round

Results by round

Results

Relegation play-offs
The 14th-placed team of Allsvenskan met the third-placed team from 2021 Superettan in a two-legged tie on a home-and-away basis with the team from Allsvenskan finishing at home.

Helsingborgs IF won 3–2 on aggregate and are promoted.

Season statistics

Top scorers

Top assists

Hat-tricks

Discipline

Player
 Most yellow cards: 12
  Sebastian Larsson (AIK)

 Most red cards: 2
  Johan Hammar (BK Häcken)
  Luke Le Roux (Varbergs BoIS)

Club
 Most yellow cards: 78
 Varbergs BoIS

 Most red cards: 5
 IF Elfsborg

Awards

Annual awards

See also

Competitions
 2021 Superettan
 2021 Division 1
 2020–21 Svenska Cupen
 2021–22 Svenska Cupen

Team seasons
 2021 AIK season
 2021 Hammarby IF season
 2021 Malmö FF season

References

External links
 

2021
1
Sweden
Sweden
Allsvenskan